A list of films released in Japan in 1952 (see 1952 in film).

See also
1952 in Japan

References

Footnotes

Sources

External links
Japanese films of 1952 at the Internet Movie Database

1952
Japanese